Penny Edwards may refer to:

 Penny Edwards (cyclist), Welsh cyclist
 Penny Edwards (actress) (1928–1998), American actress